Anatol Odzijewicz (November 10, 1947 – April 18, 2022) was Polish mathematician and physicist. The main areas of his research were the theory of Banach groupoids and algebroids related to the structure of W*-algebras, quantization of physical systems by means of the coherent state map, as well as quantum and classical integrable systems. 

Anatol Odzijewicz was also a social activist. He founded a branch of the Society for the Preservation of Monuments in Białystok and chaired it for many years. He was the founder of the open-air museum in Białowieża.

Career
In the years 1975-1979 Odzijewicz was employed at Warsaw University. Since 1979 Odzijewicz was working at University of Białystok (till 1997 it was a branch of Warsaw University). In the years 1997-2005 he was the dean of the Faculty of Mathematics and Physics, and from 2008 to 2016 - the dean of the Faculty of Mathematics and Computer Science, University of Białystok. He was also the director of the Institute of Mathematics (2005-2008 and 2016-2019). He founded and was leading a group of researchers working in the area of mathematical physics. 

He was also a founder of the conference series Workshop on Geometric Methods in Physics.

Selected publications

References

External links 
 Homepage on the website of Faculty of Mathematics, University of Białystok
 Webpage of Department of Mathematical Physics, University of Białystok

 

Mathematical physicists
20th-century Polish mathematicians
21st-century Polish mathematicians
20th-century Polish physicists
21st-century Polish physicists
Academic staff of the University of Białystok